Laksmi Shari De-Neefe Suardana, simply known as Laksmi De-Neefe Suardana, is an Indonesian fashion designer, author, UNICEF activist, 2022 G20 Ambassador, co-founder of Ubud Writers and Readers Festival, model, and beauty pageant titleholder who was crowned Puteri Indonesia 2022. Suardana is the first representative from Bali and first Hindu women to ever be crowned Puteri Indonesia. She represented Indonesia at Miss Universe 2022.

Early life and education

Laksmi Shari De-Neefe Suardana was born on 29 January 1996 in  Melbourne, Australia, to an Australian mother, Janet De-Neefe, and a Balinese father, Ketut Suardana. She was raised in Ubud, a village located in Gianyar Regency, Bali, Indonesia. She has a sister, Dewi, and two brothers, Arjuna and Krishna. She is also the granddaughter of an Australian business tycoon, John De-Neefe. Her name was inspired from Lakshmi, a Hindu goddess known for her power to turn dreams into reality. Suardana and her family witnessed the 2002 Bali bombings in Kuta, but survived the incident. Suardana is a Polyglot, She fluently speaks Indonesian, Balinese, English, Italian, Spanish and French, she masters Italian while studying and working as a fashion designer in Florence - Italy.

Laksmi earned her Diploma of Arts from Monash College in 2013. She then completed her double degree program, Bachelor of Design in Fashion Design from RMIT University in Australia and Bachelor of Business in Fashion Business from Polimoda - Politecnico Internazionale della Moda in Italy. She graduated with summa cum-laude.

Career
In 2018, Laksmi took part as an activist and contributor for UNICEF's Voices of Youth. She now actively promotes literacy and literature engagement in the society as her advocacy, knowing that the interest in writing and reading books in Indonesia is still low. Beside that, she also volunteers to teach English for a non-governmental organization in Bali.

On 31 May 2022, Suardana together with her fellow Puteri Indonesia 2022 winners, Cindy May McGuire and Adinda Cresheilla, were appointed as the 2022 G20 Ambassadors by the President of the Republic of Indonesia, Joko Widodo, at the Merdeka Palace, as part of the Indonesian presidency at the upcoming seventeenth meeting of the Group of Twenty (G20) in Bali, where the ambassadors also accompanied by Minister of Tourism and Creative Economy, Sandiaga Uno.

Ubud Writers & Readers Festival

Since a teenager, together with her parents, Suardana dedicated herself to help Bali's tourism and economy to recover after the 2002 Bali bombings through the Ubud Writers & Readers Festival, a literary festival that tries to rekindle international interest through literature and poetry events. They managed to grow it from a very small festival to the largest literary festival in Southeast Asia. It is usually held in October each year and organized by the Yayasan Mudra Swari Saraswati Foundation. In 2015, Ubud Writers & Readers Festival winning accolades, including as ”Ubud one of the top festivals in the world” by Harper's Bazaar UK and “the next Edinburgh Festival of Asia” by ABC Asia-Pacific. In 2019, the festival was named as ”one of the top five literary festivals in the world” by The Daily Telegraph in the UK.
In 2020 during COVID-19 pandemic, Suardana created the Ubud Writers & Readers Fest Instagram Live Book Club. In 2022, Ubud Writers and Readers Festival was chosen as ”one of the prime cultural festivals in autumn” by The Wall Street Journal in the US.

Pageantry

Puteri Bali 2022 
Suardana was recommended by her friend, Louise Kalista Iskandar, to join a beauty pageant, which in this case is Puteri Indonesia. Kalista herself is Puteri Sumatra Barat 2020 and placed as one of the Top 6 finalists at Puteri Indonesia 2020. Laksmi witnessed and felt the impact that a beauty queen could make, therefore she was interested despite not knowing anything about pageantry. At the age of 24, she started her foray into the world of pageantry by joining a beauty camp owned by Puteri Indonesia Lingkungan 2009, Zukhriatul Hafizah Muhammad, named Ratu Sejagad. In January 2022, she competed for the title of Puteri Bali 2022 through an open audition in Jakarta, ended up winning the title.

Puteri Indonesia 2022 

As the winner of Puteri Bali 2022, Suardana represented Bali at Puteri Indonesia 2022 held in Jakarta Convention Center, Jakarta, Indonesia, on 27 May 2022. Originally, she wore the sash of Bali 1 since there was another candidate from Bali, Jazmine Callista Seymour Rowe, who was publicly voted as one of the official candidates. However, she changed her sash into Bali before the pre-quarantine since Jazmine decided to withdraw for unknown reason.

During the finale, Suardana was asked by Putri Kuswisnuwardhani whether she has any experiences that she would like to change. She answered,
 

At the end of the coronation night, Suardana successfully defeated other 43 delegates across Indonesia, She is the first Balinese and Hindu to ever be crowned Puteri Indonesia. She was crowned as Puteri Indonesia 2022 by the outgoing titleholder, Raden Roro Ayu Maulida Putri of East Java. Suardana was crowned along with her fellow Puteri Indonesia queens, Cindy May McGuire and Adinda Cresheilla.

Miss Universe 2022 
As the winner of Puteri Indonesia 2022, Suardana represented Indonesia at the 71st edition of the Miss Universe competition, but was unplaced.

Filmography 
Together with her older sister, Dewi De-Neefe, Suardana started her acting career as an extra in the film of Elizabeth Gilbert's book entitled Eat Pray Love in 2010 by Columbia Pictures and Plan B Entertainment.

Gallery

See also

 Puteri Indonesia 2022
 Miss Universe 2022
 Ubud Writers & Readers Festival
 Cindy May McGuire
 Adinda Cresheilla

References

External links

 Official Puteri Indonesia Official Website
 Official Miss Universe Official Website

Living people
1996 births
Puteri Indonesia winners
Miss Universe 2022 contestants
Child activists
Education activists
Open access activists
Indonesian human rights activists
Indonesian beauty pageant winners
Indonesian Hindus
Indonesian film actresses
Indonesian television actresses
Indonesian female models
Indonesian activists
Indonesian women short story writers
Indonesian short story writers
Indonesian columnists
Indonesian women columnists
21st-century short story writers
21st-century Indonesian writers
21st-century Indonesian poets
21st-century Indonesian women writers
Women literary critics
Indonesian women poets
RMIT University alumni
Monash University alumni
People from Bali
Balinese people
Indo people
Indonesian people of Australian descent
Australian people of Indonesian descent